Star class may refer to:

 Star-class sailboats raced in the Summer Olympic Games since 1932
 GWR star-class locomotives from the 19th century.
 GWR 4000 class locomotives from the early 20th century.
 Stellar classification
 Star-class destroyer, a class of eight pre–World War I Royal Navy destroyers.
 Star-class ferry, a class of five Ro-pax ferries built by Fincantieri, Italy for Finnlines.